State Route 534 (SR 534) is a short Washington state highway located in Skagit County. The highway was first designated as a state-maintained highway in 1937, when it became  (SSH 1H) as part of the creation of the Primary and secondary state highways; SSH 1H later became SR 534 during the 1964 highway renumbering

Route description

From Conway, the road travels eastward to intersect Cedardale Road and cross Carpenter Creek before curving southeast after intersecting Bulson Road. At the I-5 interchange, the roadway was used by 8,500 motorists daily in 2007 based on average annual daily traffic (AADT) data collected by the Washington State Department of Transportation.

History

During the 1964 highway renumbering, SSH 1H became SR 534, PSH 1 became  (I-5) and SSH 1A became . The highway's interchange with I-5 in Conway was built in 1971 to replace an at-grade crossing.

Major intersections

References

External links

Highways of Washington State

534
Transportation in Skagit County, Washington